Approaching Midnight is a 2013 American independent drama film directed, written, and produced by Sam Logan Khaleghi, and starring Jana Kramer, Sam Logan Khaleghi, Brandon T. Jackson, and Mia Serafino. Approaching Midnight was filmed in Michigan, United States.

Premise
A U.S. Army staff sergeant (Sam Logan Khaleghi) fights the threat of corruption and deception in his hometown after returning from battle.

Cast
 Jana Kramer.... Aspen
 Sam Logan Khaleghi.... Staff Sergeant Wesley Kent
 Brandon T Jackson.... Corporal Artie AJ Culpepper
 Mia Serafino.... Whisper
 Jeff Stetson.... Mayor Steven Malverne
 Patrick Sarniak.... Malverne's Attorney

Production

Development
Approaching Midnight is directed, written, and directed by Sam Logan Khaleghi. Khaleghi chose to film Approaching Midnight in Michigan because he loves the state and wanted to feature the amazing architecture and geography. American Legion members were a part of making the film as they stood in as extras and an American Legion honor guard appears in the film.

Filming
Approaching Midnight was filmed in Detroit, Farmington, and West Bloomfield, Michigan. The war sequences in the movie were filmed in Milan near Ann Arbor.

Release
In July 2013, Monterey Media bought the United States distribution rights and will release the film in the United States in Fall 2013. Approaching Midnight had its world theatrical premiere on August 27, 2013 at Emagine Royal Oak. The film was also released at the American Legion National Convention in Houston, Texas.

References

External links

2013 films
American independent films
American drama films
2013 drama films
Films shot in Michigan
2010s English-language films
2010s American films
2013 independent films